Vadym Ivanov (born 15 December 1985), is a Ukrainian futsal player who plays for Red Devils Chojnice and the Ukraine national futsal team. Vadym Ivanov played in Unisport-Budstar Kyiv, MFK Mytishchi, Viten Orsha, Lokomotiv Kharkiv, LTK Lugansk, Red Devils Chojnice and Sportleader Khmelnitsky. In 2009, he won Belarusian Futsal Premier League

References

1985 births
Living people
Ukrainian men's futsal players
Sportspeople from Kyiv
21st-century Ukrainian people